Vincenzo Macchi di Cellere (October 28, 1866 - October 20, 1919), was a Count and the Italian Ambassador to Argentina from 1907 to 1912 and Italian Ambassador to the United States in 1914 to 1919.

Biography
He was born on October 28, 1866. He was the Italian Ambassador to Argentina from 1907 to 1912. He was the Italian Ambassador to the United States from 1914 to 1919.

He died during an operation on October 20, 1919 in Washington, DC of mesenteric ischemia.

See also 
 Ministry of Foreign Affairs (Italy)
 Foreign relations of Italy

References

Ambassadors of Italy to the United States
Ambassadors of Italy to Argentina
Italian diplomats
1919 deaths
1866 births